Bietaserpine (INN), or 1-[2-(diethylamino)ethyl]reserpine, is a derivative of reserpine used as an antihypertensive agent. Like reserpine, bietaserpine is a VMAT inhibitor.

References

Antihypertensive agents
Benzoate esters
Diethylamino compounds
Monoamine-depleting agents
Pyrogallol ethers
VMAT inhibitors